Il segno del comando (i.e. "The sign of the command") is a 1971 Italian giallo-fantasy television miniseries directed by Daniele D'Anza and starring Ugo Pagliai, Carla Gravina and Massimo Girotti. It was broadcast on Programma Nazionale. It was remade in 1992 by  Giulio Questi.

Main cast

Ugo Pagliai as Lancelot Edward Forster
Carla Gravina as Lucia
Massimo Girotti as  George Powell
Carlo Hintermann as  Lester Sullivan
Rossella Falk as  Olivia
Paola Tedesco as  Barbara
 Franco Volpi  as  Prince Raimondo Anchisi
 Augusto Mastrantoni as  Col. Marco Tagliaferri
 Angiola Baggi as  Giuliana 
Andrea Checchi as  Inspector Bonsanti
 Silvia Monelli as Miss Giannelli 
 Roberto Bruni  as  Prospero Barengo
 Amedeo Girardi as  Paselli  
Laura Belli as  Powell's Friend
 Luciana Negrini as  Powell's Friend 
 Adriano Micantoni as Maresciallo

References

External links
 

1971 television films
1971 films
Italian television films
Mystery television series
Italian fantasy television series
1971 Italian television series debuts